Schröter or Schroeter may refer to:

Schröter (lunar crater), a crater on the Moon
Schroeter (Martian crater), a crater on Mars
Schröter (surname)

See also 
 Schroter's Valley (AKA Vallis Schröteri), a lunar feature named after Johann Hieronymus Schröter